The Solomiya Krushelnytska Lviv State Academic Theatre of Opera and Ballet or Lviv Opera is an opera house located in Lviv, Ukraine's largest western city and one of both Polish and Ukrainian historic cultural centers. Originally built on former marshland of the submerged Poltva River, the Lviv Opera now located on Freedom Avenue, the tree-lined centerpiece of Lviv's historic Old City, a UNESCO World Heritage Site located in the city's Halych district.

According to the inscription in the theater lobby, the building was constructed between 1897 and 1900, and has remained standing throughout several changes in history. Originally built when Lviv was the capital of the autonomous province of Galicia in the Austro-Hungarian Empire, the Lviv Opera first stood at the end of Archduke Karl Ludwig Avenue, was later known as the Grand Theatre of the Second Polish Republic, and during the time of Soviet rule, entering patrons would pass by a towering statue of Vladimir Lenin. For four decades, the theater was known as the Ivan Franko Lviv State Academic Theatre of Opera and Ballet, having been renamed in 1956 after the city's famous poet and political activist on the centenary of his birth. In 2000, the Lviv Opera celebrated its own centennial with another renaming, this time after one of the city's native daughters, Solomiya Krushelnytska, a renowned soprano of the early 20th century.

History
At the end of the 19th century, local leaders felt the need for a large city theatre to be situated in the capital of Galicia. In 1895, the city announced an architectural design competition, which attracted a large number of submissions. Among the participants were the renowned Viennese architects Fellner & Helmer, whose entry was rejected as too international and eclectic.

An independent jury chose the design by Zygmunt Gorgolewski, a graduate of the Berlin Building Academy and the director of city's Engineering Academy. Gorgolewski pleasantly surprised the jury by planning to locate the building in the center of the city, despite the area having been already densely built-up. In order to solve the space problem, he boldly proposed to enclose the Poltva River underground, and instead of using a traditional foundation, utilized a reinforced concrete base for the first time in Europe.

In June 1897, the cornerstone was placed. Gorgolewski oversaw construction, earthwork and design, employing the leading stonemasons from the city and beyond. Local materials were used wherever possible, however marble elements were manufactured in Vienna, special linen for painting in the foyer was imported from Belgium. The German company Siemens, ran the electrical wiring and lights, while the hydraulic mechanization of the stage was built by the Polish railway workshop company in Sanok.

Construction continued for three years. Funding came from the city, the surrounding communities, and from voluntary donations. The cost of the works totaled 2.4 million Austrian crowns.

Stories remain that despite the engineering innovations used by Gorgolewski to construct the foundation of the building, it began to slowly sink because of the Poltva river running underneath it in a tunnel. In July 1903 he died suddenly of paralysis of the aorta of the heart. After some initial settling, the building ceased 'sinking' and remains stable to this day, owing to the innovative design of Gorgolewski.

Immediately prior to the fall of the Soviet Union, the first performance of the national anthem of Ukraine, Shche ne vmerla Ukrainy i slava, i volia, was held at the theatre in 1990, during the last perennial rule of Soviet Ukraine.

Grand opening

The Lviv Opera opened on October 4, 1900. The cultural elite—painters, writers, and composers, as well as delegations from various European theatres—attended the opening festivities. Among the guests attending the ceremony were writer Henryk Sienkiewicz, composer Ignacy Jan Paderewski, the painter Henryk Siemiradzki, the Chief magistrate of Lviv Godzimir Małachowski, the provincial governor Leon Piniński and head of the provincial assembly Count Stanisław Badeni. A delegation from the city of Prague was headed by mayor Vladimir Srb and former director of the National Theatre, František Adolf Šubert. Due to recent deaths of both the Roman Catholic and Greek Catholic archbishops, the building was blessed by the Armenian Catholic archbishop of Lviv, Izaak Mikołaj Isakowicz, alongside rabbi Ezechiel Caro and the Protestant pastor Garfel.

The grand opening gala that evening included excerpts from: 
 The ballet Baśń nocy świętojańskiej (Tale of the Midsummer Night) by Jan Kasprowicz and Seweryn Berson
 The opera, Janek by Władysław Żeleński, about the life of Carpathian mountain-dwellers, with an aria sung by the Ukrainian tenor, Oleksandr Myshuha, for whom it was specially written.
 A comedy Odludki (Recluses) by Aleksander Fredro

Architectural style

The Lviv Theatre of Opera and Ballet is built in the classical tradition using forms and details of Neo-Renaissance and Neo-Baroque styles. There are also elements of Art Nouveau. The stucco mouldings and oil paintings on the walls and ceilings of the multi-tiered auditorium and foyer give it a richly festive appearance. The Opera's imposing facade is opulently decorated with numerous niches, Corinthian columns, pilasters, balustrades, cornices, statues, reliefs and stucco garlands. Standing in niches on either side of the main entrance are allegorical figures representing Comedy and Tragedy sculpted by Antoni Popiel and Tadeusz Barącz; figures of muses embellish the top of the cornice. The building is crowned by large bronze statues, symbolizing Glory, Poetry and Music.

The theatre, beautifully decorated inside and outside, became a centrefold of the achievements in sculpture and painting of Western Europe at the end of the 19th century. The internal decoration was prepared by some of the most renowned Polish artists of the time. Among them were Stanisław Wójcik (allegorical sculptures of Poetry, Music, Fame, Fortune, Comedy and Tragedy), Julian Markowski, Tadeusz Wiśniowiecki, Tadeusz Barącz, Piotr Wojtowicz (relief depicting the coat of arms of Lviv), Juliusz Bełtowski (bas-relief of Gorgolewski) and Antoni Popiel (sculptures of Muses decorating the façade).

Among the painters to decorate the interior were Tadeusz Popiel (staircases), Stanisław Rejchan (main hall), Stanisław Dębicki, Stanisław Kaczor-Batowski and Marceli Harasimowicz (foyer). The team supervised by the abovementioned artists included further painters, among them Aleksander Augustynowicz, Ludwik Kohler, Walery Kryciński, Henryk Kuhn, Edward Pietsch, Zygmunt Rozwadowski, Tadeusz Rybkowski and Julian Zuber. The main curtain was decorated by Henryk Siemiradzki.

Gallery

See also
List of opera houses
History of Lviv

Notes 

a. The Habsburg Empire. The World of the Austro-Hungarian Monarchy in Original Photographs 1840-1916 by Franz Hubmann, Vienna, 1971, attributes this theatre to Fellner & Helmer.

References

External links

  Lviv National Opera - Official website
 Opera House, Lviv Krushelnitskaya National Academic Theatre of Opera and Ballet (Lviv)

Theatres completed in 1900
Buildings and structures in Lviv
Opera houses in Ukraine
Tourist attractions in Lviv
Music venues completed in 1900
Culture in Lviv
Theatres in Lviv
1900 establishments in Austria-Hungary
Establishments in the Kingdom of Galicia and Lodomeria
Academic theatres
Institutions with the title of National in Ukraine